Maurice Cowan (1891-1974) was a British writer and producer. He produced the first films of Norman Wisdom. He disliked working with Wisdom so much on One Good Turn he vowed never to work with the comedian again.

He was editor of The Picture Goer when he came up with an idea for what became the film I Live in Grosvenor Square. He sent it to Herbert Wilcox would bought it.

Select credits
A Yank in London (1945) aka I Live in Grosvenor Square - story
A Voice in the Night (1946) aka Wanted for Murder - add dialogue
Springtime (1946) aka Spring Song - story
Meet Me at Dawn (1947) - dialogue
Murder on Monday (1952) aka Home at Seven - producer
Derby Day (1952) - producer
Turn the Key Softly (1953) - producer, writer
Trouble in Store (1953) - producer, writer
One Good Turn (1955) - producer, writer
Man of the Moment (1955) - story
Babes in the Wood on Ice (1956) - book
The Gypsy and the Gentleman (1958) - producer
Operation Amsterdam (1959) - producer
The Men from Room 13 (1959–61) - research
Watch It, Sailor! (1961) - producer
The Six Wives of Henry VIII (1970) - series ideas

References

External links

British film producers
1891 births
1974 deaths